Cars Race-O-Rama is a 2009 racing game published by THQ for the PlayStation 2, PlayStation 3, Xbox 360, Wii, Nintendo DS, and PlayStation Portable. The game is the sequel to Cars Mater-National Championship (2007).

Gameplay

Cars Race-O-Rama is a racing adventure game in which the player controls Cars protagonist and Piston Cup racer Lightning McQueen. The game features five nonlinear open worlds, including Radiator Springs. In each area McQueen can participate in multiple race types, including circuit races, relay, and point-to-point. Some events allow the player to control other characters, such as the forklift Guido in events known as Guido Kart. During these events the player participates in combat racing similar to that found in the Mario Kart series.
 
Throughout the single-player campaign players will have the opportunity to visually upgrade McQueen. In his starting configuration the player can change McQueen's front bumper, hood, side skirts and spoiler. Additionally his wheels and paint livery can be changed via unlocks from the gameplay world collectables.

Development
Cars Race-O-Rama debuted at E3 2009. The primary version was developed by Incinerator Studios, and this version was released on PlayStation 3, Wii, Xbox 360, and PlayStation 2. It was powered by Rainbow Studios' engine, which had been the technology behind the previous two Cars installments. The PSP and DS versions of the game were created by Tantalus Media in Melbourne and Brisbane, Australia. A toy line for the release was released in early 2009, as the name "Race O Rama" was used for the 3rd series of Mattel Die-Cast Disney Cars. This is the last Disney/Pixar video game published by THQ as well as the last game to be published by any other company except Disney Interactive Studios until 2017 when Cars 3: Driven to Win was published by Warner Bros. Interactive. It is also the final Cars game to be released on the PlayStation 2.

Reception

Cars Race-O-Rama received mixed reviews, according to Metacritic.

IGN noted that the game felt like a cash grab, saying that it felt like the "soulless husk of a great movie". Game Informer wrote, "It’s not fun to explore, and aside from activating a few boring minigames, there’s no reason to cruise around the levels," with regards to exploration. GamesRadar+ said that the game was fun for children and praised its characters and customization while criticizing the price tag, character designs, and lack of iteration.

Legacy 
Cars Race-O-Rama is infamous for being incompletable when played on Xbox 360. The final achievement found in the game, titled "OVER-ACHIEVER!", is unobtainable due to a glitch where the achievement will not unlock when the requirements are met. (Unlock all other achievements found in the game.) The game currently sits at a 0% completion total on achievement-tracking website TrueAchievements.

References

External links
 Cars Race-O-Rama at Internet Movie Database
 Cars Race-O-Rama Review at IGN

2009 video games
Cars (franchise) video games
Disney video games
Nintendo DS games
PlayStation 2 games
PlayStation 3 games
PlayStation Portable games
Racing video games
THQ games
Video games developed in Australia
Video games set in Arizona
Video games set in the United States
Wii games
Wii Wheel games
Xbox 360 games
Video games based on films
Multiplayer and single-player video games
Tantalus Media games
Video games developed in the United States